Begós is a locality located in the municipality of Es Bòrdes, in the Province of Lleida of Catalonia, Spain. As of 2020, it has a population of 18.

Geography 
Begós is located 171km north of Lleida.

References

Populated places in the Province of Lleida